99 Levels to Hell is a 2D platform shooter by Danish developer bom667 and published by Zaxis. The game has 100 levels which are randomly generated, and they are divided into 10 sections of 10 levels each. Death in a section sends players back to the beginning of the section rather than the beginning of the entire game. In the game, players assume the role of a wizard and start off with a shotgun until they can find better means such as laser weapons or magic. As an arcade game, the player is able to look any direction on the 2D screen, giving the ability to shoot, cast magic, or blast with a laser, anything anywhere on the screen.

The game's story was written by Chris Powell and Graham Cookson (both have a small involvement in the gaming industry, including running the SEGA-related gaming publications seganerds.com and Mega Visions Magazine). It is read in poem form by the game's narrator when the player picks up story books throughout the game.

Reception
HardcoreGamer.com's James Cunningham rated the game 4 out of 5 saying, "99 Levels to Hell is a fun and bloody descent into the not-quite-bottomless depths, loaded with replayability and almost impossible to put down until the poor explorer has lost his last heart of health."

References

2012 video games
Linux games
MacOS games
Role-playing video games
Side-scrolling video games
Video games developed in Denmark
Windows games